Alliance for Smiles (AfS) is a nonprofit organization founded in 2004 in San Francisco. They provide free surgical repairs for cleft lip and cleft palate, with missions mostly in the continents of Asia and Africa.  They also work to develop treatment centers where continuous follow-up care can be provided.

Early History of Alliance for Smiles
Alliance for Smiles was founded in October of 2004 by Anita Stangl, Burt Berry, James Patrick, Jim Deitz, John Goings, and John Uth. Dr Karin Vargervik, D.D.S., previous director of the Craniofacial Center at the University of California San Francisco, was chosen to lead the AfS treatment center program, which aims to create international treatment centers that replicate the U.S. protocol of cleft treatment.

Programs
Alliance for Smiles organizes international volunteer missions to provide cleft lip and cleft palate repair in under-served communities, manages programs to assist hot countries in reaching cleft lip and cleft palate repair self-sufficiency, and organizes an international medical fellowship program for pre-med students entering the medical field.

Surgical missions
Alliance for Smiles organizes two-week surgical missions to provide free cleft lip and palate surgery in various under-served countries. The team consists of about 12 medical professionals and 4 non-medical volunteers. During a typical mission, 70 to 100 children receive surgical care. The AfS team collaborates with local medical practitioners to communicate on proper medical procedures and to give follow-up treatment. Follow-up care is often required because a patient may need follow-up surgeries, orthodontic treatment, speech therapy, and other medical care.

Teaching missions 
During teaching missions, Alliance for Smiles sends a small team of medical professionals to train local doctors and nurses on how to operate on very complex cleft cases.

International Medical Fellowship program 
The International Medical Fellowship is a 14-day opportunity for students interested in the medical field to learn about cleft surgeries by supporting and observing doctors and nurses on an AfS mission.

References 

Health charities in the United States
Oral and maxillofacial surgery organizations
Non-profit organizations based in San Francisco